A Bergmeister was a mine manager or foreman in German-speaking Europe who, along with the Bergvogt, was one of the officials serving on a mining court (Berggericht). There were Bergmeisters in every mining district in Germany. In Austria the Bergmeister was also called the Obristbergmeister.

See also 
Bergordnung
Bergrecht
Bergregal

References 

Resource extraction occupations
Miners